A rifle grenade is a grenade that uses a rifle-based launcher to permit a longer effective range than would be possible if the grenade were thrown by hand.

The practice of projecting grenades with rifle-mounted launchers was first widely used during World War I and World War II and continues to the present, with the term "rifle grenade" now encompassing many different types of payloads including high explosive, fragmentation, anti-tank warheads, concussion, smoke, incendiary, and flare missiles.

Rifle grenades have largely been supplanted in the infantry fire support role by a combination of grenade launchers (typically affixed to rifles) and disposable anti-armor rockets.

History

Early use 

Adaptation of grenades for use in rifles began around the 18th century, when cup-shaped dischargers were fitted to the barrels of flintlock muskets, with the grenades propelled by the force of a blank cartridge. During the early 20th century a Japanese Colonel Amazawa experimented with rifle fired grenades during the Battle of Port Arthur in the Russo-Japanese War, and the idea was further used by the Spanish, though the French were the first to put it to widespread use during the trench warfare of World War I.

World War I 
In 1908, Frederick Marten Hale patented the rod grenade. "A simple rod was attached to a specialized grenade, inserted into the barrel of a standard service rifle and launched using a blank cartridge." The British did not immediately adopt the idea and entered World War I without any rifle grenades. However, as soon as the trench warfare started, there was a sudden need for rifle grenades. The British government purchased a rodded variant of the No 2 grenade as a temporary solution.

By 1915, Hales had developed the No 3, which is commonly known as the Hales rifle grenade. The Hales grenade was improved throughout World War I to make it more reliable and easier to manufacture. However, production of the grenade was slow. In order to speed rod grenades to the front, the British also made rodded versions of the Mills bomb.

Although a simple approach, launching a rod grenade "...placed an extreme amount of stress on the rifle barrel and the rifle itself, resulting in the need to dedicate specific rifles to the grenade launching role, as they quickly became useless as an accurate firearm. This led to the search for an alternative and resulted in the reappearance of the cup launcher during the latter years of World War I". After World War I, the rod-type rifle grenade was declared obsolete and the remaining Hales were replaced with gas check equipped Mills Bombs shot from a rifle via a cup launcher.

The French grenade, named the V-B grenade after its inventors, Viven and Bessières, was fired from the standard service rifle with the use of a special adapter and a standard cartridge, providing an effective range of around 175 to 200 yards, while the effective radius of the bursting grenade was 75 yards. The grenade had a hollow through the middle, allowing the bullet to pass through, while the muzzle blast was captured by the launching device and used to propel the grenade. The bullet, after passing through the body of the grenade, struck a small plate that ignited the primer. This then lit the fuse in the grenade, providing an eight-second delay before detonation. It could be fired from the shoulder, but due to the heavy recoil and poor balance of the rifle fitted with the grenade, it was more common to fire it with the butt of the rifle resting on the ground, and either held at an appropriate angle, or resting on a tripod. The rifle grenade was useful in offense, particularly in attacking sandbag fortified machine gun nests, as well as in defense. Eight men armed with rifle grenades could fire 150 shots in a minute, providing a heavy barrage to break up an attacker's lines.

Upon entering World War I, the United States attempted to adopt the V-B grenade, but this was not very successful. The difference between the French and American service cartridges (8 mm vs. 7.62 mm) meant that the grenade had to be re-designed with a smaller hole, but even this was not sufficient to ensure reliable functioning, due to differences in bullet design. The American bullet would often break apart in the grenade, and this led to the V-B derived grenade design being scrapped in May 1918.

The next United States attempt at a rifle grenade was to return to and develop an improved rod-grenade. The Babbitt grenade, developed by Colonel E. B. Babbitt of the U. S. Ordnance Department, used a long stem projecting from the rear of the grenade, which was slipped into the barrel of the Springfield 1903 rifle, and propelled with a special blank cartridge. The stem was calibrated with a number of grooves and a split ring, which allowed the user to set the grenade to slide a certain distance into the muzzle of the rifle. With the stem was inserted only part way, the chamber pressure upon firing was reduced, propelling the grenade a shorter distance. When fired at a 45-degree angle, ranges from 50 to 300 yards were possible; with the rifle angled at 80 degrees, ranges as short as 15 yards were possible. In addition to providing the force to propel the grenade, the gases from firing were directed through a hollow in the stem, and provided force to arm the grenade. Once armed, the grenade had a heavy plunger that would detonate the grenade upon impact.

World War II 
After World War I, the rifle grenade was steadily modified to increase its effectiveness when launched from a rifle.

In 1928, the Italian Army adopted an unusual cup-type 38.5 mm rifle grenade launcher bolted to the side of a normal Carcano 6.5 mm carbine, the Moschetto di Fanteria Mod. 91/28 con Tromboncino. In use, the rifle's bolt was removed and installed in the launcher chamber. The rifle was placed butt-first against the ground, a grenade loaded down the launcher's muzzle and standard rifle round loaded into the grenade launcher's chamber. When fired, the bullet was trapped, the neck of the cartridge case expanded and the gases passed into launcher's barrel through four holes providing the energy needed to launch the grenade. After the grenade was launched, the chamber was opened, ejecting the spent cartridge case and making the bullet fall out. The necessity of changing the rifle bolt kept the rifle out of use until the bolt could be replaced, a slow and clumsy procedure. The bolt-changing procedure could also result in lost rifle bolts in the heat of battle, putting the weapon out of action completely. As a result, this design was not adopted by any other nation. Today, it can be seen as an early, if unsuccessful ancestor of modern under-barrel grenade launchers such as the M203.

The Japanese military continued to experiment with rifle and hand-thrown grenades between the wars and would adopt a family of fragmentation grenades with almost universal adaptability. Introduced in 1931, the Type 91 fragmentation grenade could be thrown by hand, fired from a cup-type grenade launcher (the Type 100), discharged by a lightweight mortar-like projector (the Type 89 grenade discharger, or knee mortar). or fitted with tail-fin assembly and fired from a spigot-type rifle grenade launcher.

The spigot-type grenade launchers were used by Japanese Special Naval Landing Forces to launch an anti-tank (hollow-charge) finned grenade. They were also used to propel Type 91 hand grenades fitted with tail-fin assemblies. These grenades had wood-bulleted launching cartridges stored in their tail-fin assemblies. The cartridges are fired from the rifle and the wooden bullets are trapped by the tail-fin assemblies launching and arming the grenades. These launchers are not numbered, and production figures are not available and examples of spigot grenade launchers are rarely encountered.

In 1939, the Japanese introduced the Type 89 grenade discharger, the Type 91 fragmentation grenade was fitted with a propellant base and time fuse. It did not explode upon contact, but was designed to ignite its fuse while in flight. A weak creep spring inside the grenade firing mechanism allowed the firing pin to be thrown back upon launching, igniting a time fuse with a 7-8 second delay. Using this system, the Type 91 grenades could be launched through jungle cover or through small openings without the danger of premature detonation in the event the grenade struck an object on its way to the target. Although the Type 89 could be fired by a single person, it was typically operated with a crew of 3, enabling it to reach a rate of fire of about 25 rounds per minute.

In 1939, The Japanese also introduced the Type 100 grenade discharger for the Type 38 and Type 99 Arisaka rifles. It launches standard Type 91 and Type 99 hand-grenades. The launcher is somewhat unusual in that rather than using the more common cup designs it is a gas trap system, meaning that it incorporates a barrel extension which taps off excess propellant gases to launch the grenade from a cup offset from the barrel. This has the advantage that standard rifle cartridges could be used along with the standard hand-grenades which simplified logistics, at the expense of increased weight and decreased efficiency. The effective range is approximately 100 yards.

In 1940, Britain put the first anti-tank grenade into the field during World War II the No. 68 AT grenade, which was one of the first "of any" type anti-tank weapons with a shaped charge or high-explosive anti-tank (HEAT) type warhead. The design of the warhead was simple and could penetrate  of armor in 1940. The simple fins gave it some stability in the air and detonation occurred on impact.

In 1942, an attachable rifle grenade launcher called the Gewehrgranatengerät or Schiessbecher ('shooting cup') was introduced that was developed based on rifle grenade launcher models designed during World War I. The 30 mm Schiessbecher cup-type rifle grenade launcher could be mounted on any Karabiner 98k and was intended to replace all previous rifle grenade launcher models. The rifle grenade launcher could be used against infantry, fortifications and light armored vehicles up to a range of 280 m (306 yd). For these differing tasks, several specialized grenades with accompanying special propelling cartridges were developed for the 1,450,113 produced Schiessbecher rifle grenade launchers. The rifle grenade-propelling cartridges fired a wooden projectile through the barrel to the rifle grenade that, upon impact, automatically primed the rifle grenade. The Schiessbecher could be mounted on the Karabiner 98a, G98/40, StG 44 and FG 42

The Japanese would also adopt a version of the German Schiessbecher grenade launcher. The Type 2 rifle grenade launcher was an attachment for the Type 38 and Type 99 rifles that allowed them to fire special hollow charge grenades. Two grenades were produced for the launcher: a 30 mm grenade and a larger, 40 mm grenade, both designated Type 2. The launcher sits over the end of the barrel, held in place with a clamping device. A special crimped blank cartridge or wooden bullet is used to fire the grenades.

In the years just before World War II, the United States adopted the spigot-type 22 mm rifle grenade launchers. These 22 mm launchers are attached to a rifles muzzle, in the form of a detachable adapter. As with most rifle grenades, it is propelled by a blank cartridge inserted into the chamber of the rifle. A 22 mm grenade can range from powerful anti-tank rounds such as the M9 rifle grenade, to simple finned tubes with a fragmentation hand grenade attached to the end such as the M1 grenade adapter. The "22 mm" refers to the diameter of the base tube which fits over the spigot of the launcher, not the diameter of the warhead section, which is much wider.

Modern use 
After World War II, many countries adopted 22 mm spigot-type launchers and anti-tank rifle grenades with shaped charge or high-explosive anti-tank (HEAT) warheads. The Belgian ENERGA anti-tank rifle grenade design in particular was widely adopted by Western nations. These post-war designs come in "standard" type which are propelled by a blank cartridge inserted into the chamber of the rifle. And, the newer "bullet trap" and "shoot through" types, as their names imply use live ammunition.

The M31 HEAT rifle grenade is a fin-stabilized anti-tank rifle grenade designed in the late 1950s to replace the Belgian ENERGA rifle grenade which was adopted by the US Army and US Marines as an emergency stop-gap measure during the Korean War. Compared to the ENERGA, the M31 is slightly lighter in weight and has a smaller-diameter warhead—i.e. 75 mm vs 66 mm. Penetration for the M31 is estimated to be 200 mm / 8 inches for steel armor plating  and twice that estimate for concrete.

The bullet-trap rifle grenade became increasing popular in the post-war years, most notably the French AC58 anti-armor and APAV40 multi-purpose grenades. The 22 mm rifle grenade launchers were further simplified, becoming an integral part of the rifle itself. All current NATO rifles are capable of launching STANAG 22 mm rifle grenades from their flash hiders without the use of an adapter.

By the late 1960s, rifle grenades and their launchers were slowly replaced by disposable single shot rocket launchers such as the M72 LAW (light anti-tank weapon), and dedicated 40 mm grenade launchers. First seen in the United States armed forces, these 40 mm grenade launchers generally took the form of separate weapons, such as the M79 grenade launcher. Or, as an under-barrel attachment to an assault rifle, such as the M203 grenade launcher attached to an M16 rifle.

Today, there is a return to the concept of the rifle grenade, such as the SIMON breach grenade, the IMI Refaim, FN Herstal Telgren and the Japanese Type 06 advance grenades. These grenades were designed to be used by ordinary riflemen as opposed to specially trained grenadiers. For example, the MECAR rifle grenades are equipped with simple ballistic sights and have an effective range of 300 meters.

Modern combined arms doctrine dictates that every infantry unit should have a certain percentage of dedicated grenadiers, or soldiers equipped with a grenade launcher or combination rifle/grenade launcher. The criticism of this doctrine is that if the grenadiers in a group are disabled or separated from the group, then the group has completely lost the grenade launcher as a heavy fire support. With the addition rifle grenades, each soldier would be equipped with a small number of rifle grenades, so every individual soldier could use some form of heavy firepower. However, all of these rifle grenades add additional weight to the soldiers war-load and as a consequence they must reduce the amount of rifle ammunition that they carry. For example, a modern French AC58 "bullet trap" rifle grenade weighs .5 kg, the equivalent of a loaded M16 STANAG magazine.

The AK-47 can mount the Kalashnikov cup-type grenade-launcher that uses standard Soviet RGD-5 hand-grenades. The soup-can shaped launcher is screwed onto an AK-47's muzzle. The maximum effective range is approximately 150 meters. The M16 has a similar device used to launch tear-gas hand-grenades.

On 10 April 2021, during 2021 Myanmar protests, security forces killed at least 82 protesters in Bago town with rifle grenades.

Comparison of performance

Designs

Rod-type 
The rod-type rifle grenade is a standard hand grenade with a metallic rod attached to the base. They were developed before World War I. To use:

 Insert the rod-type rifle grenade down the barrel of a standard rifle
 Insert a special blank cartridge into the rifle's chamber
 Place the rifle's butt-stock on the ground
 While holding the grenade's safety spoon with one hand, remove the safety pin with the other
 Place free hand on the rifle's grip and prepare to fire
 Release the grenade's safety spoon, quickly place said hand on the rifle's fore stock and immediately fire the rifle

If the soldier does not immediately launch the grenade, it will time out and explode. It was later found that the repeated launching of rod grenades caused damage to a rifle's barrel and the rod-type rifle grenade fell from favor.

Cup-type 
The cup-type launcher replaced the rod-type rifle grenade during World War I. This soup-can shaped launcher is attached to a rifle's muzzle. The cup-type launcher could launch a standard hand-grenade or a purpose built cup-type grenade. To use:

 Insert a grenade into the cup launcher. When using a standard hand-grenade remove the safety pin, the cup holds the safety-spoon in place until launched
 Insert a special blank cartridge into the rifle's chamber
 Place the butt-stock of the rifle on the ground and fire from this position

"Shoot-through" type 
The cup-type launcher has the advantage of using standard hand-grenades. However, the need to load a blank cartridge into the rifle's chamber in order to launch the grenade proved to be clumsy in combat. This difficulty lead to the development the French "Vivien and Bessières" shoot-through grenade (or VB grenade). As the name implies, these grenades allow for the use of standard ball ammunition. The VB grenade has a hole through the middle that permits the passage of a standard bullet; this arms the grenade, the expanding gasses launch the grenade, and the grenade explodes 8 seconds later. This removes the need to provide a special blank round to launch the grenade. To use:

 Insert VB grenade into the cup-type launcher
 Place the butt-stock of the rifle on the ground and fire from this position

Spigot-type 
The 22mm type rifle grenade launcher was developed before World War II. This type of launcher is attached to a rifle's muzzle and allows for the use of a wide range of rifle grenades, from powerful anti-tank rounds to simple finned tubes with a fragmentation hand-grenade attached to the end. These rifle grenades come in "standard" type, which are propelled by a blank cartridge inserted into the chamber of the rifle; or, "bullet trap" and "shoot through" types, which allow the use of live ammunition. All modern 22mm rifle grenades explode on impact. All Standard issue NATO rifles are capable of launching STANAG type 22mm rifle grenades from their integral flash hiders without the use of an adapter. Modern bullet-trap rifle grenades such as the French APAV40 can be fired as fast as a soldier can place a grenade on an FAMAS rifle's muzzle and pull the trigger. To use:

 Place 22mm rifle grenade over the spigot attachment or the rifle's flash hider
 Aim at target and fire rifle

Other uses and similar devices 

During the Second World War, Nazi Germany developed and fielded a propaganda rifle grenade (Propaganda-Gewehrgranate). It was designed for front-line troops to disperse propaganda leaflets via a rifle grenade that would disperse the printed material via a small ejecting charge.

The advent of less lethal grenades for riot control has led to the creation of gun launched versions of these grenades, though they are typically launched by riot shotguns, not rifles. These systems use a cup-type launcher attached to the muzzle of the gun to launch various less lethal grenade types.

A golf ball launcher is a cup-type launcher which is used for sport or recreational purposes. These launchers are designed to replace an AR-15 type rifle's flash hider.

There's also a soda/beer can launcher. Unlike the golf ball launcher that screws onto the end of the barrel, where the AR-15 family of rifles' flash hider attaches, the can launcher tube is fitted directly to the AR-15 upper receiver and is the entire barrel assembly. Both the golf ball launcher and can launcher require the use of blank ammunition.

Advantages and disadvantages 
Compared to a standard hand-grenade, a rifle grenade:
 Can be projected to a much greater distance
 Can carry a larger, heavier payload
 Can effectively project a shaped charge warhead which can penetrate armor
 Has the advantage of detonating upon impact
 Is more accurate

However, a rifle grenade:
 Requires a rifle to launch
 Is more complicated to use than a hand grenade.
 Is larger and heavier than a hand grenade.
 Produces very high levels of recoil when launched from a rifle.

Compared to a dedicated grenade launcher, a rifle grenade:
 Can be of a variety of different sizes and shapes of warheads and payloads
 Can be projected from any rifle fitted with an appropriate muzzle base or spigot tube fitting; in essence, every soldier armed with a rifle can be a grenadier
 Can fire up to 10 grenades per minute for area suppression, for a modern bullet-trap rifle grenade
 Requires a simple, smaller, and cheaper launcher attachment (or even no attachment at all) when compared to a standalone grenade launcher

However:
 A rifle grenade will temporarily disable the normal use of the rifle
 A dedicated grenade launcher can be fired from the shoulder without undue discomfort, something not normally possible with a rifle grenade
 A soldier armed with a dedicated grenade launcher can carry 2 to 3 times more grenade ammo than rifle grenades
 A dedicated grenade launcher is more accurate than a rifle grenade

Compared to a rocket launcher, a rifle grenade:
 Has a curved trajectory, allowing indirect fire against targets in defilade, behind walls and buildings or rooftops
 Is much lighter and does not require the user to carry a bulky launcher tube
 Can be safely fired from inside a building whereas a Rocket Launcher cannot due to the danger of backblast

However:
 Rocket launchers have a flatter trajectory making them more accurate "point-and-shoot" weapons
 Rocket launchers generally have more powerful warheads
 Rocket launchers generally have a longer effective range

See also 
 Tromboncino M28, Italian combination carbine and grenade launcher of 1928
 Kbkg wz. 1960
 Dilagrama m/65
 Hand mortar
 Mk 2 grenade
 Bazooka
 Rocket-propelled grenade

References

External links 
 Carcano Model 91/28 with Tromboncino

Grenades
Grenade launchers
Explosive weapons
 
Infantry weapons